Shanghai's Best (also known as Shanghai's Best Street Food) is a Chinese restaurant in Portland, Oregon. The business operates from the Pine Street Market, as of 2022, and has previously operated from Portland's Alder Street food cart pod and in Salem.

Description
Shanghai's Best specializes in shengjian mantou, a type of fried baozi (steamed buns). Pan-fried dumplings are made with pork, chicken, vegetarian, or vegan fillings. The vegetarian variety has egg, chives, and mung bean noodles, and the vegan version has tofu, mushrooms, carrot, and celery. The menu also includes steamed buns with barbecued pork or sweet red bean paste, as well as mooncakes.

History
Owner Lin Chen established the business in April 2018. In 2019, the Alder Street food cart pod closed for the development of Block 216 and the Ritz-Carlton, Portland. The Shanghai's Best food cart was initially placed into storage, then relocated to The Yard Food Park in Salem in October 2019. The business began operating from the Cart Blocks in July 2021. Shanghai's Best operates from the Pine Street Market, as of 2022. The restaurant also participated in The Oregonian annual Dumpling Week in 2022.

Reception

In 2018, Andrea Damewood of the Portland Mercury included Shanghai's Best in her overview of "great new choices for your dumpling fix". She wrote:  In her 2021 article "Best Thing I Ate This Week: Pan-Fried Pork Dumplings from Shanghai's Best", Portland Monthly Katherine Chew Hamilton wrote, "The dumplings were a delight—meaty, juicy but not greasy, with crackly bottoms and pillowy tops, and generously sprinkled with sesame seeds." Seiji Nanbu and Brooke Jackson-Glidden included Shanghai's Best in Eater Portland's 2022 overview of "Where to Find Outstanding Chinese Food in Portland and Beyond". The business was also included in Eater Portland's 2022 overview of "Where to Eat and Drink in Downtown Portland".

See also

 History of Chinese Americans in Portland, Oregon
 List of Chinese restaurants

References

External links
 

2018 establishments in Oregon
Chinese restaurants in Portland, Oregon
Culture of Salem, Oregon
Food carts in Portland, Oregon
Restaurants established in 2018
Southwest Portland, Oregon